All Saints Church is an active Parish Church in the town of Batley, Kirklees, West Yorkshire, England. Built in 1485 and been an active place of worship for Christians since before 1086. The church is located on Stocks Lane. Near to the town centre, the church is the main parish church of the town and local suburbs.

References

Grade I listed churches in West Yorkshire
Churches completed in 1485